is a fictional character from Square Enix's video game franchise Kingdom Hearts. First making cameo appearances in Kingdom Hearts II and its updated version Final Mix, Aqua is one of the three playable protagonists who is introduced in the 2010 prequel Kingdom Hearts Birth by Sleep. She is one of the Keyblade apprentices training under Master Eraqus alongside her friends Terra and Ventus. As the only one among her friends to obtain the rank of Keyblade Master, Aqua is assigned to monitor Terra and Ventus as she combats dark creatures known as the Unversed.

She has also appeared in other Kingdom Hearts titles, including Kingdom Hearts HD 2.8 Final Chapter Prologue as the main character of the playable episode Kingdom Hearts 0.2: Birth by Sleep – A Fragmentary Passage, and as a boss and temporary playable character in Kingdom Hearts III.

Aqua is the only protagonist in Birth by Sleep whom Tetsuya Nomura did not have a point of reference to design from, and thus was designed from scratch. Later in the design process, Nomura became concerned that Aqua would not be popular, which drove his decision to make her more distinct in her personal bravery and combat abilities. Aqua is voiced by Megumi Toyoguchi in Japanese and Willa Holland in English. The character received mixed reviews from game critics upon her debut, citing boring plot lines and unenthusiastic voice acting combined with weak combat skills. However, her role in Kingdom Hearts 0.2 has been more positively received, with critics favoring her stronger characterization over previous depictions.

Appearances
Before her introduction as a main character in Kingdom Hearts Birth by Sleep, Aqua made small appearances in the secret endings from Kingdom Hearts II and its re-release, Kingdom Hearts II Final Mix, both events depicting Aqua, Terra, and Ventus confronting Xehanort at the Keyblade Graveyard. Kingdom Hearts II Final Mix also contains an additional cutscene showing Aqua's Keyblade and armor to be stored in the "Chamber of Repose", a hidden room in Hollow Bastion that is frequented by Xemnas.

In Birth by Sleep, Aqua and her friends are Keyblade apprentices in the Land of Departure, where she obtains the "Mark of Mastery" early in the game. Under Eraqus's orders, Aqua travels to various worlds to search for a missing Xehanort and defeat the Unversed, simultaneously monitoring Terra's vulnerability to darkness and trying to retrieve Ventus when he runs away to find Terra. However, both duties bring her into conflict with her friends when she confronts Terra over his questionable activities on their quest. Aqua later reunites with her friends at the Keyblade Graveyard, where Terra is possessed by Xehanort, while Ventus sacrifices his own heart to prevent the creation of the χ-blade. Aqua uses Eraqus's Keyblade to transform the Land of Departure into Castle Oblivion, leaving Ventus's catatonic body there, before confronting the possessed Terra at Radiant Garden. When Xehanort unlocks his own heart to subdue a resisting Terra and sinks into the realm of darkness, Aqua dives in and salvages Terra's body, remaining trapped in the dark realm. In the game's secret ending, she meets Ansem the Wise at the realm's edge, learning from him about the heroics of Sora, whom she had encountered as a young boy during her travels. Her time in the realm of darkness is depicted in the game's Final Mix release and Kingdom Hearts 0.2: Birth by Sleep – A Fragmentary Passage; in the latter, she encounters her friend Mickey Mouse by chance during the events of the first Kingdom Hearts game before remaining behind to fend off the Heartless attacking Riku.

Aqua makes cameo appearances in Kingdom Hearts Re:coded, where she is revealed to be one of the many people connected with Sora's heart, and in Kingdom Hearts 3D: Dream Drop Distance as part of Sora's memories and in the ending where she is still at the shores in the dark realm. In Kingdom Hearts III, Aqua becomes corrupted by darkness after being attacked by Xehanort's Heartless, but is purified after losing to Sora, who returns her to the realm of light. She subsequently restores the Land of Departure to wake Ventus, who revives when Sora returns his heart. The two join the other Keyblade wielders assembled as the seven guardians of light, who clash with Xehanort's reconstituted Organization XIII at the Keyblade Graveyard. There they battle the possessed Terra, whom Sora helps break free from Xehanort's control, reuniting the three friends. Aqua and the other Keyblade wielders later help keep the door to Kingdom Hearts closed, allowing Sora to defeat Xehanort. Afterwards, Aqua and her friends return home before joining their friends in a celebration on the Destiny Islands just before Sora disappears as a price for using the power of waking to revive Kairi, whose body was destroyed by Xehanort. In the Kingdom Hearts III Re Mind DLC, one year after Sora's disappearance, Aqua, alongside Terra and Ventus, head on a journey to the Realm of Darkness to look for clues to Sora's whereabouts.

Aqua also makes an appearance in Super Smash Bros. Ultimate as a spirit.

Creation and development
For Aqua's unnamed first appearance in the secret ending of Kingdom Hearts II, director Tetsuya Nomura stated he did not design her appearance, but had instead focused on what her story would be. While unwilling say who the character was, Nomura pointed that new character's scenes occurred prior to the events from the first game. Following the release of Kingdom Hearts II Final Mix, Nomura revealed more details about Aqua such as a connection with the character Xemnas. Nomura also revealed her name as said by the Lingering Sentiment in Kingdom Hearts II Final Mix, and explained that her name follows the "water" theme brought by Kairi's name. However, a connection with Kairi was not intended, but rather with the series' main characters whose names bear various themes.

In contrast to Terra and Ventus, Aqua did not have a reference point for the characters design, leading Nomura to create a completely new character from scratch. Her outfit was based on Terra's Japanese-inspired clothes which are meant to expand the student-and-teacher bond shown in the game. Aqua's outfit was altered three times during the game's development. Nomura felt the open back of Aqua's outfit presented at the Tokyo Game Show 2009 was too revealing and modified the design to be more conservative. As with Terra and Ventus, the making of Aqua's outfit created issues for Nomura like how she would be able to summon her armor. To remedy this, an "X" was added to her clothes as a means to activate her armor. When designing Aqua, Nomura was worried the character would be unpopular due to her weak connection with other Kingdom Hearts characters. This led to a push to make the character distinctly "strong", which Nomura also did with Xion for Kingdom Hearts 358/2 Days, but in a different way. While Xion was also a "brave girl", Nomura wanted to retain Aqua's feminine qualities along with her strength. After design was completed, Nomura was still unsure of how Aqua would be received. After the game's release, however, Nomura noted her popularity with fans, and referenced Megumi Toyoguchi's work as her voice actress as one of the reasons. Toyoguchi had already worked with Nomura in Final Fantasy X-2 voicing Paine, one of the game's protagonists. While Toyoguchi used a low tone with Paine, she used a tone closer to her original voice when performing as Aqua, which Nomura praised.

From the beginning of Kingdom Hearts Birth by Sleep's development, the staff decided its story would have three plot lines centered around three different characters, with Aqua's being the last one written. The original ending of Aqua's storyline showed her trapped in the realm of darkness, which was moved to the game's "Last Episode" in order to keep the game from being too negative in tone. In terms of gameplay, Aqua was designed to be a character that players would take some getting used to, and recommended them use her as the last one in order to understand the game's story better, pointing out the intention that Aqua would be the last character to leave the Land of Departure in her scenario. The staff developed her movements to reflect her personality as a serious and dignified young woman. In the making of Kingdom Hearts 2.8, co-director Tai Yasue expressed the staff wanted to explore Aqua's torment in this title as she became trapped in the realm of darkness to the point they showed how the character wanted to escape from it as she became isolated. Nomura was surprised by people's reaction to Aqua falling into the darkness in the E3 2018 trailer for Kingdom Hearts III, and expects her role in the upcoming game to surprise the audience more.

Reception
Aqua's character has received mixed response from video game publications, with initial comments focused on her brief appearance in Kingdom Hearts II. Writing for GamesRadar, Chris Antista commented that he did not understand the importance of Aqua and the other characters being briefly featured in Kingdom Hearts II; only later was their importance explored at the end of Birth by Sleep. Prior to Aqua's appearance in Birth by Sleep'''s trailers, 1UP.com's Jeremy Parish stated that fans speculated the character would be male. Having played a demo from Birth by Sleep as Aqua in the E3 2010, Ryan Clements from IGN enjoyed her character due to her gameplay mechanics.

While reviewing Birth by Sleep, Adam Ghigiino from PALGN criticized her "idealistic" dialogues, finding them repetitive. PlayStation LifeStyle's Thomas Williams found the trio as welcome additions to the franchise, finding their stories enjoyable even though the three travel to the same worlds. Kevin VanOrd from GameSpot gave praise to Aqua's character, based on her personality and how it contrasts Ventus's, as well as Holland's voice acting. 1UP.com's Steve Watts found Aqua's gameplay as the weakest of all the three characters as she specializes in magic techniques, which are weak during the game's start. On the other hand, Bob Miur from Destructoid found her gameplay appealing due to how it contrasts previous fighting styles seen in the Kingdom Hearts series. He also found her story less entertaining than Ventus's, but also less predictable than Terra's. Following Square's advice of using Aqua as the last playable Game Informer writer Bryan Vore liked how her actions were played with Ventus's and Terra's. However, Bore still cited Aqua's playthrough as repetitive if played as the last one, adding that its plot was weakest from all of them. Alongside Ventus and Terra, X-Play found Aqua similar to the protagonists from Kingdom Hearts, comparing her to Kairi. In contrast to Van Ord, RPGFan's Ashton Liu found Aqua's voice "bored for almost the whole game", citing how it is notable when comparing her with other voice actors such as Mark Hamill and Leonard Nimoy. On the other hand, HardcoreGamer regarded Willa Holand's acting as more appealing during Kingdom Hearts III. In an ASCII Media Works poll, Aqua was voted as the twelfth most popular video game character from 2010. In a Famitsu poll from 2011, Aqua was voted as the fourth most popular Kingdom Hearts character.

Aqua's role in Kingdom Hearts 0.2 was praised by Siliconera. The writer enjoyed how the game explores Aqua's vulnerability as well as her strength and sacrifice to protect her friends. Additionally, the writer commented that "We see that she's not some perfect heroine capable of accomplishing everything, but rather a strong woman who's willing to do what she has to for the greater good". Chris Carter from Destructoid expressed disappointment with the fact that none of the three protagonists of Birth by Sleep were saved by this game, but still wanted to play as any of them. Kimberly Wallace from Game Informer said Aqua was one of her favorite characters due to "her selflessness and determination to save the world, and getting some resolution to her story was satisfying". She also commented that she expected Aqua to play a bigger role in Kingdom Hearts III''.

References

Further reading

Characters designed by Tetsuya Nomura
Female characters in video games
Fictional aviators
Fictional empaths
Fictional explorers in video games
Fictional knights in video games
Fictional witches
Kingdom Hearts original characters
Square Enix protagonists
Video game bosses
Video game characters introduced in 2010
Video game characters who use magic
Video game characters with water abilities
Woman soldier and warrior characters in video games